Angel "Papo" García de Jesús is a Puerto Rican politician who served as a member of the Puerto Rico House of Representatives at the 34th District later as Mayor of Yabucoa. García is affiliated with the New Progressive Party (PNP) and served as mayor from 2001 to 2013.

References

|-

 

Living people
Mayors of places in Puerto Rico
New Progressive Party members of the House of Representatives of Puerto Rico
People from Yabucoa, Puerto Rico
Year of birth missing (living people)